Apartamento is an interiors magazine founded in 2008 that is published biannually. It features people, their homes and the lives they lead inside them every day. The magazine was founded by Nacho Alegre, Marco Velardi, and Omar Sosa, who sought to create a publication that felt more personal than the interior design and architectural magazines available at the time. The magazine debuted at Milan’s 2008 Design Week.

History
The idea for Apartamento was born out of Alegre’s experiences traveling across Europe as a photographer. He would often stay with friends and in the process, became interested in how people express themselves through their living spaces. Originally, he and Sosa thought they would publish a book, but later decided to create a magazine instead. In 2008, Alegre, Velardi and Sosa, started Apartamento in Barcelona, operating from Alegre's house. In April of the same year, they published the first issue of the magazine. Alegre and Sosa invested enough money to produce 5,000 copies, which sold out. The first issue featured Mike Mills, a founding member of the alternative rock band R.E.M. and members of the Mystery Jets, an English indie rock band.

Concept
Apartamento is, in part, a reaction to the sterile and impersonal-looking homes Alegre, Velardi and Sosa often saw in interior-design and architectural magazines. They instead wanted to showcase living spaces that had a more "lived-in feel."

Reception
Apartamento has developed a strong following. It is read in 45 countries and regularly sells out all of the copies produced.

References

External links

2008 establishments in Spain
Architecture magazines
Biannual magazines
Design magazines
Magazines established in 2008
Magazines published in Barcelona